Liam O'Neil(l) or O'Neal may refer to:

Sportspeople
Liam O'Neill, a Gaelic games administrator
Liam O'Neill (rugby union) from London Wasps
Liam O'Neill (Gaelic footballer) (born 1947), Irish former Gaelic footballer
Liam O'Neil (footballer) (born 1993), English footballer for Cambridge United

Fictional characters
Liam O'Neal, a Forever Knight character played by Cedric Smith
Liam O'Neill, a Sons of Anarchy character played by Arie Verveen

Others
Liam O'Neil (musician), Canadian musician
Liam O'Neill (artist) from The Folks on the Hill